The discography of Veliki Prezir, a Serbian alternative rock band from Vrbas, consists of four studio album, one live album, one compilation album and eight various artists compilation appearances.

Studio albums

Live albums

EPs

Singles

Music videos

Other appearances

References 

 EX YU ROCK enciklopedija 1960-2006, Janjatović Petar; 
 Veliki Prezir at Discogs
 Veliki Prezir at Rateyourmusic
 Veliki Prezir at YouTube

Discographies of Serbian artists
Rock music group discographies